The Teliuc mine is a large open pit mine in the western of Romania in Hunedoara County, 15 km west of Hunedoara and 406 km north-west of the capital, Bucharest. Teliuc represents one of the largest iron ore reserves in Romania having estimated reserves of 3 million tonnes of ore. The mine produces around 100,000 tonnes of iron ore/year.

References 

Iron mines in Romania